Pray Lake is located in Glacier National Park, in the U. S. state of Montana. A vehicular access National Park Service campground is adjacent to the lake.

See also
List of lakes in Glacier County, Montana

References

Lakes of Glacier National Park (U.S.)
Lakes of Glacier County, Montana